Helmy Rafla (May 15, 1909 – April 22, 1978) was an Egyptian film director, writer, and producer.

External links

Helmy Rafla at ElCinema

 Egyptian Copts
 Egyptian film producers
 Egyptian film directors
1909 births
1978 deaths
Helmy Rafla was a famous Egyptian director, He began his career as a make up man.